The National Private Pilot Licence is a licence to fly UK registered aircraft within the UK. There are three Class ratings that can be included in the licence. Microlight, Simple Single Engine Aircraft (SSEA) and Self Launched Motor Glider (SLMG). Each Class has its own training syllabus.

Further details of each Class and training requirements are published on the NPPL website.

Legal authority
The National Private Pilot Licence is issued by the United Kingdom Civil Aviation Authority. Holders are entitled to fly UK registered single-engined aircraft or microlights and self-powered gliders within UK airspace. Aircraft pilots may carry up to 3 passengers and fly using VFR Visual Flight Rules during daylight hours. It has more restrictions than a full Private Pilot Licence (PPL), but requires fewer hours of practical training and less stringent medical checks.

The NPPL may be taken as a goal in its own right, or used as a step towards the full PPL which permits flying in other countries and other qualifications. Thirty hours of practical flying instruction counts towards the 45 hours minimum requirements of the PPL.

There are separate syllabuses for aeroplanes and self-launching motor gliders.

The principal reference for flight crew licensing in the UK is LASORS, which is published annually by the CAA on paper and online. After 17 September 2012, this will be replaced by CAP 804.

Territory
Holders of the NPPL are qualified to fly within UK airspace including the Isle of Man, Channel Islands and now France.

Flights must be conducted according to Visual Flight Rules (i.e. in sight of the ground and away from cloud). This includes both controlled and uncontrolled airspace. Special VFR flights may be permitted on request of air traffic control, enabling transit through a control zone which would otherwise be out of bounds.

Aircraft
Only UK registered aircraft of up to four seats and with a maximum indicated airspeed (IAS) of 140 knots may be flown.

NPPL holders can be licensed to fly different types of aircraft. They will require a few hours of additional differences training on each new type of aircraft and an additional type rating licence to be issued.

Passengers
An NPPL pilot with the appropriate medical declaration may take up to three passengers (i.e. a total of four on board). This must not be for remuneration, although costs of the flight may be shared.

Before taking passengers, pilots must have conducted three take-offs and full-stop landings in the same aircraft type within the preceding 90 days.

Medical requirements
The NPPL has much less stringent medical requirements than a full PPL. The pilot's General Practitioner, who has access to the medical records of the applicant, can sign the medical declaration. The GP is allowed to charge for this service, but in practice many do not. There are two levels which match those required for professional drivers – DVLA Class 1 permits solo flight and flight with another pilot, while  DVLA Class 2 permits flights with up to three passengers.

The medical declaration form must be signed off prior to the first solo flight and lasts for five years up to the age of 64 and beyond 65 years of age lasts for one year.

Training
Flight training is available from most flight schools around the UK. Instruction is given by qualified PPL flight instructors – there is no separate or reduced grading for NPPL instructors themselves. A minimum of 25 hours flying time is required (for microlight aircraft, 32 for light aircraft), of which at least 10 hours must be solo. The solo flight time must include 4 hours of cross country which may include the solo qualifying cross country flight of at least 100 nm with two landings away. A further 2 to 3 hours flying time should be allowed for the two practical tests that follow.

Seven theory exams must be passed – these are the same syllabus and level as for the PPL although the authorities are considering introducing a simplified syllabus.

A practical VHF radio operator examination with a qualified examiner must be attained. This is not required for flights (including solo flights) while still under training.
Competency in the use of the English Language must be certified.

Two practical tests must be passed:
 A Navigation Skills Test, which involves flying a distance of 100 nm. This is shorter than the 150 nm required for the PPL, and many choose to undertake the longer test to avoid retaking it when upgrading to PPL later.
 A General Skills Test, where the pilot is required to demonstrate competence across the whole range of abilities for safe flying.

Licensing
Once the requirements and tests have been passed, the NPPL Licence itself is issued within a few weeks through the National Pilot Licensing Group Limited, authorised by the CAA who publish a guide on the requirements and how to obtain one. The licence must be re-validated every 2 years.

In order to remain current, NPPL pilots are required to:
 have flown for 12 hours within the previous 24 months
 have flown for 6 hours within the previous 12 months
 have had 1 hour of dual-instruction from a qualified instructor
 have a valid medical declaration

Alternatively, another General Skills Test may be taken.

Limitations
NPPL holders may not:
 fly non-UK registered aircraft
 fly outside UK territorial waters except for Channel Islands, Isle of Man or France.
 qualify directly for night flying or Instrument Flying Rules

Future changes

The European flight crew regulations are expected to change in 2012 and be centrally administered by the European Aviation Safety Authority. Proposals have been made to introduce an EU-wide light aircraft pilot licence (LAPL) in the future, replacing national licences such as the UK NPPL. Existing NPPL pilots are likely to be able to transfer to this new scheme without further (re)tests. This may allow today's NPPL pilots to fly in other EU countries. The CAA's interpretation of the expected effects of this new European legislation were updated in June 2011.

References

External links
 

Aviation licenses and certifications
Aviation in the United Kingdom
Flight training in the United Kingdom